Investigation of a Citizen Above Suspicion is a 1970 Italian crime drama film directed by Elio Petri, starring Gian Maria Volonté and Florinda Bolkan. It is a  psychological, black-humored satire on corruption in high office, telling the story of a top police officer who kills his mistress, and then tests whether the police would charge him for this crime. He begins manipulating the investigation by planting obvious clues while the other police officers ignore them, either intentionally or not.

The film was released in Italy by Euro International Pictures on 9 February 1970, to widespread acclaim from critics. It won the Jury Prize at the 1970 Cannes Film Festival, and the David di Donatello Awards for Best Film for Best Actor (Gian Maria Volonté). In the United States, it won the Oscar for Best Foreign Language Film. Petri and his co-writer Ugo Pirro were nominated for Best Original Screenplay.

In 2008, Investigation of a Citizen Above Suspicion was placed on the Italian Ministry of Culture's 100 films to be saved, a list of films "that have changed the collective memory of the country between 1942 and 1978."

Plot summary
A recently promoted police inspector, nicknamed "Il Dottore" ("the Doctor", an Italian honorific) kills his mistress, and then covers up his involvement in the crime. He insinuates himself into the investigation, planting clues to steer his subordinate officers toward a series of other suspects, including the woman's gay husband and a student leftist radical. He then exonerates the other suspects and leads the investigators toward himself to prove that he is "above suspicion" and can get away with anything, even while being investigated. He eventually confesses to the crime in front of his superiors - who refuse to believe him. Sure that he is safe, he recants his confession, and receives the approval of the police commissioner. The interrogation at his home is revealed to be a dream sequence and the film ends with the actual arrival of the commissioner and other colleagues.

Cast

Release
Investigation of a Citizen Above Suspicion was released in Italy on February 9, 1970, where it was distributed by Euro International Films. In Italy, the film had a domestic gross of 1,928,248,000 Italian lire.

Critical reception 
Investigation of a Citizen Above Suspicion was well received by critics and is widely considered one of the best international films of the 1970s. The New York Times called the film "a suspense melodrama with the moral concerns of angry satire [...] When it opened in Italy early this year (and later, when it was shown at Cannes), Investigation was hailed for the ways in which it exposed the corrupt, authoritarian practices of the police, who place themselves above their own laws [...] The story moves forward with a relentless momentum. It is a political parable, and a stunning movie."

The film has a Rotten Tomatoes approval of 100% based on 15 reviews, with an average score of 8 out of 10. On Metacritic  it has a score of 89 out of 100 based on 10 reviews. 
David Fear of Time Out called it "[a] paranoid police procedural, a perverse parable about the corrupting elements of power, and a candidate for the greatest predated Patriot Act movie ever [...]". Kenneth Turan called the film "as troubling today as when it came out in 1970. Maybe more so."

Accolades 
The film was highly regarded in its own time, winning the Academy Award for Best Foreign Language Film, and both the FIPRESCI Prize and the Grand Prize at the 1970 Cannes Film Festival. Also it won the Edgar Award for Best Motion Picture from the Mystery Writers of America.

Cancelled remake
The Cannon Group had hoped to remake the original film with Andrei Konchalovsky (of Runaway Train fame) attached to direct. Paul Schrader was attached to write, as he wrote both a story treatment and a screenplay. It was going to have either Al Pacino or Christopher Walken to star in the remake. Originally, Cannon released an ad, planning to shoot in October 1987, and having it premiere it at Cannes in 1988, although it never got made as it was shelved. It remained shelved until in the 90s, when it was resurrected by Jodie Foster's production company Egg Pictures.  Sidney Lumet was attached to direct, but the film never made it beyond pre-production.

See also
 List of submissions to the 43rd Academy Awards for Best Foreign Language Film
 List of Italian submissions for the Academy Award for Best Foreign Language Film
 Poliziotteschi

References

Bibliography

External links 
 
 
 Investigation of a Citizen Above Suspicion: The Long Harm of the Law an essay by Evan Calder Williams at the Criterion Collection

1970 films
1970s Italian-language films
1970 crime drama films
1970s political drama films
1970s psychological thriller films
Italian satirical films
Italian crime drama films
Best Foreign Language Film Academy Award winners
Edgar Award-winning works
Police detective films
Italian political drama films
Films about miscarriage of justice
Films directed by Elio Petri
Films scored by Ennio Morricone
Films set in Italy
Films with screenplays by Ugo Pirro
Films set in Rome
Poliziotteschi films
Cannes Grand Prix winners
1970s Italian films